Volosovskaya is a rural locality (a village) in Kargopolsky District, Arkhangelsk Oblast, Russia. The population was 1 as of 2012.

Geography 
Volosovskaya is located 27 km southwest of Kargopol (the district's administrative centre) by road. Makarovskaya is the nearest rural locality.

References 

Rural localities in Kargopolsky District